Hong Ji-yeon (born ) is a retired South Korean female volleyball player.

She was part of the South Korea women's national volleyball team at the 1998 FIVB Volleyball Women's World Championship in Japan. She participated in the 1996 Summer Olympics.

References

External links
Hong Ji Yeon at Sports Reference
http://www.fivb.org/EN/volleyball/competitions/WorldGrandPrix/2011/Team_Roster.asp?Tourn=wgp2011&Team=KOR

1970 births
Living people
South Korean women's volleyball players
Korea National Sport University alumni
Place of birth missing (living people)
Asian Games medalists in volleyball
Volleyball players at the 1994 Asian Games
Volleyball players at the 1998 Asian Games
Volleyball players at the 1996 Summer Olympics
Asian Games gold medalists for South Korea
Asian Games silver medalists for South Korea
Medalists at the 1994 Asian Games
Medalists at the 1998 Asian Games
Olympic volleyball players of South Korea